Giacomo Cantelli da Vignola (February 1643 − 30 November 1695) was an Italian cartographer and engraver of the 17th century.

Early life
Born in Vignola, Cantelli attended the University of Bologna.

Career
Cantelli was hired as secretary by the Marquis of Ferrara. Later he moved to Venice, becoming well known as a geographer and cartographer. From 1672 his maps were published by Giovanni Giacomo de Rossi. Early works depicted the Holy Land, Persia and the Ottoman Empire. In the 1680s came maps of Lombardy, Kingdom of Sicily, Qing China, Tartary, Greece, the Moluccas, India and parts of Europe. In 1685 Cantelli was made court cartographer to Francesco II d'Este, Duke of Modena. He published a well-known 1689 map of Serbia.

His last works were a map of Spain and one of north-western Italy with the Dauphiné and Provence. He died in 1695 at the age of 52.

References

External links
 

1643 births
1695 deaths
17th-century Italian cartographers
Cartographers of the Middle East
People from Vignola
University of Bologna alumni